Thornber is a surname. Notable people with the surname include:

Catherine Thornber (c. 1813–1894), Australian headmistress
Harry Thornber (1851–1913), British cricketer
Kraig Thornber (born 1961), British actor, singer and choreographer
Richard Thornber (1867–?), British footballer
Steve Thornber (born 1965), British footballer